Grant Road (named after Sir Robert Grant, the Governor of Bombay between 1835 and 1839, formally Maulana Shaukatali Road) is a locality in South Mumbai. Grant Road railway station serves this area.

Grant Road  along with Tardeo and Mumbai Central have been a neighbourhood of Mumbai City dominated by the Jains, Muslims and the Parsi & Irani Zoroastrians. It is considered as the place of ancestral roots of the originating Zoroastrians of the city mainly being the areas of Balaram Street and Sleater Road. It has 4 Fire temples and The Cama Baug is an important place for the Wedding Ceremonies and other functions of the Parsis of Mumbai.

Grant Road is the fourth station on the Western local line preceded by Churchgate, Marine Lines, Charni Road, and followed by a main junction, Mumbai Central. Most slow trains halt at this station, which is useful for people who want to reach Opera House, Nana Chowk, Lamington Road and the Roxy theatre.

The Gilder Tank is one of the oldest tanks in the city originating the roots of Yazdani, Cooper and the Gilder Families of Mumbai. B'Merwan Cake Shop and Bakery is one of the oldest bakeries in the City of Mumbai which has catered to nearly all classes of people from students and mill workers 
Grant Road is famous for its electronic items purchase at Lamington Road. Sir H.N. Reliance Foundation Hospital and Research Centre is one of the most important and oldest hospitals in the city of Mumbai. It is also an access point to the Tower of Silence at Kemps Corner which is the only remaining one after the closure of the dakhma at Andheri's Salsette Parsi Colony on the Salsette Island and even the Wilson College.

It is among the access points towards the residential areas of Gamdevi and Walkeshwar, Gowalia Tank

Grant Road had a number of theatres until 2004, namely the Novelty Cinema (now apartments), Super Cinema, Apsara, Jamuna, Minerva, Royal Talkies, New Roshan Talkies, Nishat Cinema, Imperial Cinema, Alfred Theatre and Shalimar Cinema.

The Zoroastrian Shoppe near Cama Baug and the Appo Menes and Company are one of the oldest surviving Zoroastrian shops of the city which caters to the traditional weaving of Sudreh Kasti and other religious items to the Zoroastrian Community of the Bombay City.

The Grant Road Skywalk is the latest and the most iconic addition to the skywalks of Mumbai due to its round architecture.

Grant Road is also for its Irani Cafes like the B'Merwan and the Persian Bakery & Stores at Balaram Street. The Sheetal Store on Malauna Shaukatali Road is the one of the oldest surviving saree store in this area.

References 

Roads in Mumbai